Assessment (ASMNT) is a peer-reviewed academic journal that covers research in the field of psychology, especially applied clinical assessment. The editor is 
Douglas B. Samuel (Purdue University). It was established in 1994 and is currently published by SAGE Publications. This journal is a member of the Committee on Publication Ethics (COPE).

Abstracting and indexing 
ASMNT is abstracted and indexed in Scopus, in PsycINFO, and in the Social Sciences Citation Index among others. According to the Journal Citation Reports, its 2017 impact factor is 3.197, ranking it 26 out of 127 journals in the category "Psychology, Clinical".

References

External links 
 

SAGE Publishing academic journals
English-language journals
Psychometrics journals
Quarterly journals
Publications established in 1994